Wunna Kyawhtin Htay Myint is the chairman of the Yuzana Company, a major conglomerate in Myanmar (Burma) and served as Member of Parliament in the Pyithu Hluttaw for Myeik Township from 2011 to 2016. He also owns the  Southern Myanmar United Football Club. In 1994, he founded the Yuzana Company, which is involved in the transportation, construction, hotel, palm oil and rubber production industries.

References

People from Tanintharyi Region
Members of Pyithu Hluttaw
Burmese businesspeople
Burmese people of Chinese descent
1955 births
Living people
Recipients of the Wunna Kyawhtin